María Antonia Sánchez Lorenzo  (born 7 November 1977) is a retired tennis player from Spain.

Her highest WTA ranking has been world No. 33, a position she achieved in April 2004.

She played two-handed on both sides, and her favourite surface was the hardcourt, unusual for a Spanish tennis player.

At the 2005 French Open, Lorenzo defeated reigning champion Anastasia Myskina in three sets in the first round, which became the first time the reigning champ of the French Open lost in the first round.

WTA career finals

Singles: 3 (1 title, 2 runner-ups)

Doubles: 3 (3 runner-ups)

Performance timeline

ITF Circuit finals

Singles: 12 (9–3)

Doubles: 3 (1–2)

Top 10 wins

External links
 
 
 

1977 births
Living people
Spanish female tennis players
Sportspeople from Salamanca
20th-century Spanish women